Brock Harris (born February 1, 1988) is an American model and actor who became known after appearing in Têtu magazine. The short film The Last Hunt, produced by Harris, was highlighted by the Sundance Film Festival.

Biography and career 
Harris is the son of a teacher of educational administration at a university and a deacon in a local church. His mother is a teacher of physical education. Being the second of four children, Harris was born and raised in Stillwater, Oklahoma. Harris practiced martial arts and trained to compete jujitsu. After studying at the school Stillwater Boys Choir, Harris entered and graduated as a musician and actor at The Hartt School of Music at the University of Hartford.

When a freshman in college, he enrolled in the Asics after seeing an ad on the Internet seeking collegiate wrestlers to model. After doing the photo shoot for Asics stayed away for a while due to a surgery to remove a tumor from the back. In 2008 he gained popularity on the Internet after being on the cover of French magazine Têtu.

Filmography

Film

Television

References

External links 
 

1988 births
21st-century American male actors
American male television actors
Male models from Oklahoma
American male musicians
Living people
Male actors from Oklahoma
American screenwriters
University of Hartford Hartt School alumni